Koloni is a village in the Paphos District of Cyprus, located 5 km east of Paphos and east of Geroskipou Municipality.

References

Geroskipou